The Villa Vauban is an art museum in Luxembourg City. It exhibits 18th- and 19th-century paintings acquired from private collections.

Background
Built in 1873 as a private residence, the villa owes its name to a fort built on the same site by Sébastien Le Prestre de Vauban (1633–1707) as part of the city's defences. An impressive section of the old fortress wall can be seen in the museum's basement. The renovation work, completed in 2010, was planned by Philippe Schmit of the Luxembourg architectural firm Diane Heirent & Philippe Schmit. As a result of its innovative perforated copper cladding, the extension received the TECO Architecture Award in 2010. The museum is located in a park laid out by the French architect Édouard André (1840–1911), one of the leading landscape architects of his day.

History
Designed by city architect Jean-François Eydt, the residence was built by an Alsacian glove manufacturer, Gabriel Mayer, in a classical 19th-century style with a Neoclassical facade. It was located on a large plot which became available after the city's fortifications were demolished, providing room not only for the residence and its stables but also for an extensive French-style garden. In 1874, it was acquired by steel manufacturer Charles Joseph de Gargan before it came into the hands of the industrialist Norbert Le Gallais in 1912. After acquiring the villa in 1949, the City of Luxembourg adapted it for rental by the ECSC Court Of Justice. In 1959, it was converted once again in order to house the art collections which are still exhibited there today. Grand Duke Jean and Grande Duchess Joséphine Charlotte lived there from 1991 to 1995 while renovation work was being carried out at the Palace.

Collections
The works exhibited at the Villa Vauban were originally part of three separate collections, all of which were bequeathed to the city. The first is that of Jean-Pierre Pescatore (1793–1855), who established himself as a wealthy banker in Paris. It is made up principally of 17th-century Dutch paintings, contemporary French works, as well as sculptures and drawings. The second, consisting  mainly of 19th-century art, stems from Leo Lippmann (1808–1883), a banker and Consul General of Luxembourg in Amsterdam. The third collection, which once belonged to the pharmacist Jodoc Frédéric Hochhertz, comprises 18th century history paintings, still lifes and portraits. It was later inherited by Eugénie Dutreux-Pescatore (1810–1902). The Dutch Golden Age paintings include works by Cornelis Bega, Gerrit Dou and Jan Steen while Eugène Delacroix, Jean-Louis-Ernest Meissonier and Jules Dupré are among the artists who painted the 19th-century French works.

See also
List of museums in Luxembourg
Culture of Luxembourg

References

Art museums and galleries in Luxembourg
1873 establishments in Luxembourg
Art museums established in 1959
Museums in Luxembourg City